Dimosthenis Tampakos (born 12 November 1976 in Thessaloniki) is a Greek gymnast and Olympic gold medalist.

He won gold in the men's rings at the 2004 Summer Olympics in Athens with a score of 9.862. He had also won the silver medal at the 2000 Summer Olympics in Sydney. In 2003 he tied for first place with Yordan Yovchev at the World Championships.  He also won twice the gold medal at the European Championships in 2000 (Bremen) and in 2004 (Ljubljana).

References

External links

1976 births
Living people
Gymnasts from Thessaloniki
Gymnasts at the 2000 Summer Olympics
Gymnasts at the 2004 Summer Olympics
Greek male artistic gymnasts
Olympic gold medalists for Greece
Olympic silver medalists for Greece
Olympic gymnasts of Greece
World champion gymnasts
European champions in gymnastics
Medalists at the World Artistic Gymnastics Championships
Olympic medalists in gymnastics
Medalists at the 2004 Summer Olympics
Medalists at the 2000 Summer Olympics
Mediterranean Games gold medalists for Greece
Mediterranean Games bronze medalists for Greece
Competitors at the 1997 Mediterranean Games
Competitors at the 2001 Mediterranean Games
Mediterranean Games medalists in gymnastics
20th-century Greek people
21st-century Greek people